The Training Quality Standard is a standard given by the United Kingdom government to training providers whose provision is assessed as being of high quality.

Education in the United Kingdom